This is the discography of Serbian and Yugoslav rock band Kerber. This discography consists of 6 studio albums, 3 live album, 5 compilation albums, two singles and one video album. This list does not include solo material or side projects performed by the members.

Studio albums

Live albums

Compilation albums

Singles

Video albums

References
The official Kerber discography
Kerber at Discogs

Discographies of Serbian artists
Rock music group discographies